Jonathan Brace (November 12, 1754 – August 26, 1837) was an eighteenth-century American lawyer, politician and judge. He served as a  United States Representative from Connecticut.

Biography
Brace was born in Harwinton in the Connecticut Colony, the son of Jonathan Brace and Mary (Messenger) Brace. He attended the common schools and graduated from Yale College in 1779. He studied law under Oliver Ellsworth, future Chief Justice of the United States. Brace was admitted to the bar in Bennington, Vermont in 1779, and began the practice of law in Pawlet, Vermont.

Brace moved to Manchester, Vermont in 1782 and continued practicing law. He was a member of the council of censors to revise the constitution as well as a prosecuting attorney for Bennington County from 1784 to 1785. He then moved to Glastonbury, Connecticut in January 1786 but was not admitted to the Connecticut bar until 1790.

Brace was a member of the Connecticut General Assembly in 1788 and from 1791 to 1794. He was chosen assistant in the council in May 1798. Brace moved to Hartford, Connecticut in 1794 and was a judge of the city court from 1797 until 1815, with the exception of two years. He was elected as a Federalist candidate to the Fifth Congress to fill the vacancy caused by the death of Joshua Coit, and was reelected to the Sixth Congress. He served in Congress from December 3, 1798 until his resignation in May 1800.

He served as an assistant in the council of the State from 1802 to 1818. Brace was appointed prosecuting attorney for Hartford County in December 1807 and served until May 1809, when he resigned. He was appointed judge of the county court and of probate in May 1809 and continued as judge of the county court until 1821 and as judge of probate until 1824. He was the mayor of Hartford from 1815 to 1824, and was also a member of the state senate in 1819 and 1820. He died in Hartford on August 26, 1837 and was buried in the Old North Cemetery in Hartford.

Personal life
Brace was married to Ann White Brace. Their son Thomas Kimberly Brace was the principal founder and developer of the Aetna Insurance Company.

References

External links 
 Biographical Directory of the United States Congress: BRACE, Jonathan, (1754 - 1837)
 The Political Graveyard:  Brace, Jonathan (1754-1837)
 

1754 births
1837 deaths
Members of the Connecticut General Assembly Council of Assistants (1662–1818)
Yale College alumni
Connecticut Land Company
Federalist Party members of the United States House of Representatives from Connecticut
People from Harwinton, Connecticut